Xiuyu District is a district of the city of Putian, Fujian, People's Republic of China. The district executive, legislature and judiciary are in Hushi Town, together with the CPC and PSB branches.

History

In October 1952, PRC and ROC forces fought over control of Nanri Island in the Battle of Nanri Island. The ROC gained control of the island but later retreated.

On February 1, 2002, Putian County was split into Licheng District and Xiuyu District.

Around 14:10 UTC (22:10 CST) on August 8, 2015, Typhoon Soudelor made landfall over Xiuyu District as a Category 1-equivalent typhoon.

Geography

Inhabited islands in the district include:
Meizhou Island, the legendary birthplace of the goddess Matsu and a famous pilgrimage  site
Nanri Island, site of the Battle of Nanri Island in October 1952
Xiaori Island, north of Nanri Island
Xigaobei Island
Donggaobei Island
Huanggua Island
Da'ao Islet
Dongluopan Island
Chishan
Shanle Islet

Uninhabited islands in the district include:
(The Wuqiu Islands are a rural township of Kinmen County, Fujian, Republic of China (Taiwan). The islands are claimed by the PRC.)
 Lida Islet
 Lixiao Islet
 Baimian Islet
 Etou
 Dongjiaoshan
 Tayuzaiqiao
 Huangqiqing Islet
 Tinggangqing Islet
 Ai Islet
 Zao Islet
 Dingbanshiduo
 Houqing Islet
 Jilong Islet
 Shifojiao
 Fushiduo
 Li Islet
 Liaohou Island
 Niu Islet
 Shiqiujiao
 Jiangqijiao
 Sanfan Islet
 Toujin Islet
 Shichengqing Islet
 Shichengda Islet
 Chenshiduo Islet
 Dongyuzi
 Ji Islet
 Mei Islet
 Lüxunwei Islet
 Da'angjiao
 Neiyuzi
 Waiyuzi
 Luoxun Islet
 Meihuashiduo
 Majiao Islet
 Heng Islet
 Niao Islet
 Yuanlianshiduo
 Hou Islet
 Dongtou Islet
 Baishiduo
 Bai Islet
 Yuehe Island
 Zhuganjiao
 Batoushan
 Xiao'ao Islet
 Jimu Islet
 Long'ershiduo
 Gaolingpai Islet
 Xiluopan Islet
 Gewei Islet
 Xiaohengsha Islet
 Weidun Islet
 Hengsha Islet
 Xiaomin Islet
 Damin Islet
 Chizi Islet
 Chishanzi
 Xiaoyue Islet
 Dongdu Islet
 Dongyue Islet
 Dalu Islet
 Dongsha Islet
 Weisha Islet
 Xiaomai Islet
 Damai Islet
 Niushishiduo
 Haizuzi Island
 Dashiting
 Gushanzi
 Weishan
 Fu Islet
 Hailong Islet
 Datiejiao Islet
 Heishiduo
 Huzi Islet
 Dazhong Islet
 Yan Islet
 Yanshan Island
 Xiaozhong Islet
 Libiao Islet
 Waibiao Islet
 Yangyuzi
 Yang Islet
 Xiawei Islet
 Shashiduo
 Jijia Islet
 Chi Islet
 Dongchuanbaimian Islet
 Beiding Islet
 Yuziweishiduo
 Nanding Islet
 Xixiayuzi
 Dongxiayuzi
 Jianziyu
 Hong Islet
 Wu Islet
 Huang Islet
 Hujiaojiao
 Huangniuyujiao
 Yushan
 Shiliu Islet
 Waishiduo Islet
 Wenjiada Islet
 Xiao Islet
 Hushi Islet
 Chiyushan
 Waibai Islet
 Libai Islet
 Xiaoding Islet
 Gongdan Islet
 Zhong Islet
 Yangyushan
 Hou Islet
 Dading Islet
 Tiedingzi Islet
 Jishijiao
 Jin Islet
 Shimen Islet
 Hongshan
 Gui Islet
 Shi Island
 Talinqing Islet
 Dabaishiduo
 Menxia Islet
 Pan Islet
 Cai Islet
 Ping Islet

Administrative divisions
Eleven towns:
Hushi (Fashih), Dongzhuang, Zhongmen, Dongpu, Meizhou (Meichow, Meichou), Dongjiao ('Dongqiao'), Daitou, Pinghai, Nanri, Shanting, Yuetang (formerly )

Two other areas:
 Qianqin Farm,  Houhai Management Area

Climate

References

County-level divisions of Fujian
Putian